Tsholotsho South is a constituency of the National Assembly of the Parliament of Zimbabwe. Located in Tsholotsho District in Matabeleland North Province, its current MP since a 2022 by-election is Musa Ncube of ZANU–PF. The previous MP, Zenzo Sibanda, died in 2021.

Members

References 

Matabeleland North Province
Parliamentary constituencies in Zimbabwe
Tsholotsho District